"Salvador Dalì" is a song released by Italian rappers, Marracash and Guè Pequeno, from the studio album Santeria, released in 2016.

The song
Composed and recorded in Santa Cruz de Tenerife, Spain, this is the first song created for the album. Originally titled "Illegali", the two rappers decided to change the title of the song paying tribute to the figure of the Spanish painter Salvador Dalí, as they have found a similarity in the lifestyle of the painter with the rapper stereotype.

Although it was not extracted as a single, the song was certified platinum by FIMI for selling over 50,000 copies.

Music video
The music video was filmed in Milan, Brunate and Garbagnate Milanese, under the direction of Andrea and Corrado Folino Perria with the rapper Salmo as assistant director. It was created with images and suggestions recalling the works of the famous surrealist painter Salvador Dalí, and was released on October 6, 2016.

Charts

References

External links

2016 songs
Italian hip hop songs
Trap music songs
Universal Music Group singles